The Stadion Miejski w Nisku is an association football stadium in Nisko, Poland. It is the home stadium of Sokół Nisko.

History
The stadium was built in the interwar period. During World War II, a match between the Hungarian and German army teams was held there, as Hungarians won 4–3. On 16 June 2009, it hosted a first-leg final game of the Subcarpathian Polish Cup, as Sokół Nisko was defeated 6–2 by Resovia.

In 2017, the stadium underwent renovations. A cloakroom and a gym were built, the roof was replaced, pitch lighting was added, and the old stand was renovated. The cost of renovations was PLN 490,000.

On 22 July 2020, the stadium hosted the regional Polish Cup final game, as Sokół Sokolniki faced Unia Nowa Sarzyna., and eventually lost 5–0.

Dni Niska
The stadium also hosts the Dni Niska annual event, in which well-known Polish music bands take part – as Dżem, Kombi and Zakopower.

Tenants
  Sokół Nisko

References

Sokół Nisko
Nisko
Sports venues in Podkarpackie Voivodeship